This is a list of the 67 ultra-prominent summits (with topographic prominence greater than 1,500 metres) of Oceania, plus the two Ultras of the Southern Indian Ocean.

Western New Guinea

There are 12 ultra-prominent summits in Papua, Indonesia.

Papua New Guinea
There are 31 ultra-prominent summits in Papua New Guinea.

Hawaiian Islands

Of the six ultra-prominent summits of the Hawaiian Islands, two rise on the island of Hawaii, two on Maui, and one each on Kauai and Molokai.

New Zealand
New Zealand has ten ultra-prominent summits.

Pacific Islands
There are six ultra-prominent summits in the Pacific Islands, not including those of New Guinea, New Zealand, and the Hawaiian Islands which are listed separately.

Australia
The Commonwealth of Australia has two ultra-prominent summits.

Southern Indian Ocean
There are two ultra-prominent summits in the southern Indian Ocean.

Gallery

See also

Outline of Oceania
Mountain peaks of Hawaii
Ultra-prominent summit

Notes

References

Sources

Most of Oceania
Papua New Guinea
Indonesia

Oceania
Oceania
Mountains of Oceania